Marvin Orie (born 15 February 1993 in Cape Town) is a South African rugby union player for the South Africa national team, the  in the United Rugby Championship and Western Province in the Currie Cup. His regular position is lock.

Career

Youth and Varsity rugby

He played for the  side that were the losing finalists in the 2011 Under-19 Provincial Championship competition and for the  side that won the Under-21 Provincial Championship the following season. He was also a member of the South African Under-20 side that memorably won the 2012 IRB Junior World Championship on home soil, although he didn't make an appearance in the tournament.

In 2013, Orie played for Pretoria university side  in the Varsity Cup competition, helping them win the competition for the second consecutive season. He was set to captain the Junior Boks at the 2013 IRB Junior World Championship, but suffered a horrific broken leg in the Varsity Cup final and missed the remainder of the 2013 season.

Blue Bulls

Lions

References

External links
 

South African rugby union players
Living people
1993 births
Rugby union players from Cape Town
Rugby union locks
Blue Bulls players
Bulls (rugby union) players
Lions (United Rugby Championship) players
South Africa Under-20 international rugby union players
South Africa international rugby union players
Golden Lions players
Ospreys (rugby union) players
Stormers players
Western Province (rugby union) players